Beech Street Historic District may refer to the following places:
Beech Street Historic District (Helena-West Helena, Arkansas), listed on the National Register of Historic Places
Beech Street Historic District (Texarkana, Arkansas), listed on the National Register of Historic Places